John Robert Milton (born 13 May 1938), known professionally as Milton Johns, is an English character actor who has worked almost continuously throughout his career. A versatile talent, he specialises in sinister or obsequious roles and has featured regularly in many British popular television series for both adults and children. He trained at the Bristol Old Vic Theatre School.

Biography
Johns was born on 13 May 1938 in Bristol. He is known for being in Happy Families (1989) as Mr Alphonso, the café manager of Mrs Wobble, Coronation Street as Brendan Scott (1991–93), the shopkeeper who died of a heart attack while pedaling along the eponymous cobbled street. Other roles have included parts in Poldark, Born and Bred, Ever Decreasing Circles, Home to Roost, Dempsey and Makepeace, Murder Most English, Shoestring, Yes Minister, Some Mothers Do 'Ave 'Em, Softly, Softly, Going Straight, The Good Life, Don't Wait Up, Butterflies, Minder, Campion and Z-Cars. He played the landlord in The Basil Brush Show (2002–07). He also played jobsworth Mr Cassidy in Murphy's Mob, an ITV children's television drama series (1982–85). His character helped to manage the building used by the junior supporters of the football club, Dunmore United. Johns has appeared in Doctor Who on several occasions: as Theodore Benik in The Enemy of the World; Guy Crayford in The Android Invasion; and Castellan Kelner in The Invasion of Time.

He also appeared in the TV mini-series Moll Flanders in 1996. He played a pawnshop owner.

In 1972 he starred in the children's Sunday evening series The Intruder and in 1977, appeared in another children's series, Midnight Is A Place. In the 1980s, he also starred in the Grange Hill spin-off Tucker's Luck. Johns also appeared as an Imperial Officer (Captain Bewil) in the 1980 film, The Empire Strikes Back. He played Perker in the 1985 adaptation of The Pickwick Papers. In the 1988 television mini-series War and Remembrance, he took the role of Nazi SS officer Adolf Eichmann.

Filmography

References

External links
 
 
 Milton Johns

Alumni of Bristol Old Vic Theatre School
English male film actors
English male television actors
1938 births
Living people
Male actors from Bristol